The Bnei Menashe ("Children of Menasseh", known as the Shinlung in India) is a community of people from various Tibeto-Burmese ethnic groups from the border of India and Burma who claim descent from one of the Lost Tribes of Israel, with some of them having adopted Judaism. The community has around 10,000 members.

The movement began in 1951 when a tribal leader reported having a dream that his people's ancient homeland was Israel, with others then embracing the idea that they were Jews. All of them practiced Christianity prior to that. Members are from the Chin, Kuki, and Mizo ethnic groups amongst others.

In the late 20th century, Israeli rabbi Eliyahu Avichail, of the group Amishav, named these people the Bnei Menashe, based on their account of descent from Menasseh.
In 2003–2004, DNA testing of several hundred men of this group did not provide conclusive evidence of Middle Eastern ancestry. A Kolkata study in 2005 suggested that a small number of women sampled may have some Middle Eastern ancestry, but this may also have resulted from intermarriage during the thousands of years of migration of Jewish peoples. In the early 21st century, Israel halted immigration by the Bnei Menashe; after a change in government, the immigration was allowed again. The chief rabbi of Israel ruled in 2005 that the Bnei Menashe were recognized as part of a lost tribe. After undergoing the process for formal conversion, they will be allowed aliyah (immigration).

History

Biblical background
In the time of the first temple, Israel was divided into two kingdoms. The southern one, known as the Kingdom of Judah, was made up mostly of the tribes of Judah, Benjamin, Shimon and Levi. Most Jews today are descended from the southern kingdom. The northern Kingdom of Israel was made up of the ten tribes (which include half of Levi). In approximately 721 B.C.E., the Assyrians invaded the northern kingdom, exiled the leading ~20% of the ten tribes living there, and enslaved them in Assyria (present-day Iraq).

Adoption of modern Judaism

According to Lal Dena, the Bnei Menashe have come to believe that the legendary Hmar ancestor Manmasi was the Hebrew Menasseh, son of Joseph. During the 1950s, this group of Chin-Kuki-Mizo people founded a Messianic movement. While they believed that Jesus is the promised messiah for all Israelites, these pioneers also adopted the observance of the Jewish Sabbath, the celebration of holidays, the observance dietary laws and other Jewish customs and traditions which they learned from books in the early 1960s. They had no connections with other Jewish groups in either the diaspora or Israel. On 31 May 1972, some Messianic communities founded the Manipur Jewish Organization (later renamed the United Jews Organization, NEI), the first Jewish organization in northeast India.

After these people established contacts with other Jewish religious groups in Israel and other countries, they began to practice more traditional rabbinic Judaism in the 1980s and 1990s. Rabbi Eliyahu Avichail is the founder of Amishav, an organization which is dedicated to finding the Lost Tribes and facilitating their aliyah. He investigated this group's claims of Jewish descent in the 1980s. He named the group as the Bnei Menashe.

In the late 20th century, many of the Bnei Menashe started to study normative Judaism. Hundreds of them emigrated to Israel, some of them completed the formal conversion requirements there because they wanted to be accepted as Jews. Critics believed that the government's policy of settling the Bnei Menashe immigrants in the unstable Judea, Samaria and Gaza Strip was part of a recruiting campaign to help increase the size of Israel's Jewish population. Others considered these people economic migrants rather than true Jews. In 2005, the Chief Rabbinate of Israel accepted them as Jews due to the devotion displayed by their practice through the decades, but still required individuals to undergo formal ritual conversion to be accepted as Jews. Later that year, Israel began to refuse to issue visas to these peoples after India objected to Israeli teams entering the northeast states to perform mass conversions and arrange aliyah.

History of the Chin-Kuki-Mizo people
Prior to their conversion to Christianity in the 19th century, the Chin-Kuki-Mizo practiced animism; ritual headhunting of enemies was part of their culture. Depending upon their affiliations, each tribe identifies primarily as Kuki, Mizo/Hmar, or Chin. The people identify most closely with their subtribes in the villages, each of which has its own distinct dialect and identity. They are indigenous peoples, who had migrated in waves from East Asia and settled in what is now northeastern India. They have no written history but their legends refer to a beloved homeland that they had to leave, called Sinlung/Chinlung. The various tribes speak languages that are branches of indigenous Tibeto-Burman.

Influence of revivalism
During the first Welsh missionary-led Christian Revivalism movement, which swept through the Mizo hills in 1906, the missionaries prohibited indigenous festivals, feasts, and traditional songs and chants. After missionaries abandoned this policy during the 1919–24 Revival, the Mizo began writing their own hymns, incorporating indigenous elements. They created a unique form of syncretic Christian worship. Christianity has generally been characterized by such absorption of elements of local cultures wherever it has been introduced.

Dr. Shalva Weil, a senior researcher and noted anthropologist at Hebrew University, wrote in her paper, Dual Conversion Among the Shinlung of North-East (1965):

Revivalism (among the Mizo) is a recurrent phenomenon distinctive of the Welsh form of Presbyterianism. Certain members of the congregation who easily fall into ecstasy are believed to be visited by the Holy Ghost and the utterings are received as prophecies." (Steven Fuchs 1965: 16).

McCall (1949) had recorded several incidents of revivalism, including the "Kelkang incident", in which three men "spoke in tongues", claiming to be the medium through which God spoke to men. Their following was large and widespread until they clashed with the colonial superintendent. He put down the movement and removed the "sorcery". (1949: 220–223).

In a 2004 study Weil says, "although there is no documentary evidence linking the tribal peoples in northeast India with the myth of the lost Israelites, it appears likely that, as with revivalism, the concept was introduced by the missionaries as part of their general millenarian leanings." In the 19th and 20th centuries, Christian missionaries "discovered" lost tribes in far-flung places; their enthusiasm for identifying such peoples as part of the Israelite tribes was related to the desire to speed up the messianic era and bring on the Redemption. Based on his experience in China, for example, Scottish missionary Rev. T.F. Torrance wrote China’s Ancient Israelites (1937), expounding a theory that the Qiang people were Lost Israelites. This theory has not been supported by any more rigorous studies.

Some of the Mizo-Kuki-Chin say they have an oral tradition that the tribe traveled through Persia, Afghanistan, Tibet, China and on to India, where it eventually settled in the northeastern states of Manipur and Mizoram.

According to Tongkhohao Aviel Hangshing, leader of the Bnei Menashe in Imphal, the capital of Manipur, when the Bible was translated into local languages in the 1970s, the people began to study it themselves. Hangshing said, "And we found that the stories, the customs and practices of the Israeli people were very similar to ours. So we thought that we must be one of the lost tribes." After making contact with Israelis, they began to study normative Judaism and established several synagogues. Hundreds of Mizo-Kuki-Chin emigrated to Israel. They were required to formally convert to be accepted as Jews, because their history was not documented. Also, given their long migration and intermarriage, they had lost the required maternal ancestry of Jews, by which they might be considered as born Jews.

Work of aliyah groups, Amishav and Shavei Israel

In the late 20th century, the Israeli Rabbi Eliyahu Avichail founded Amishav (Hebrew for "My People Returns"), an organisation dedicated to locating descendants of the lost tribes of Israel and assisting aliyah. In 1983 he first learned of the Messianic/Jewish group in northeastern India, after meeting Zaithanchhungi, an insurance saleswoman and former teacher who came from the area. She had traveled to Israel in 1981 to present papers at seminars about her people's connection to Judaism.

During the 1980s, Avichail traveled to northeast India several times to investigate the people's claims. He helped the people do research and collect historic documentation. The people were observed to have some practices similar to Judaism:

 Three festivals annually similar to those of Jews
 Funeral rites, birth and marriage ceremonies have similarities to ancient Judaism
 Historical claim of descent from a great ancestor "Manmási", whose descriptions are similar to those of Manasseh, son of Joseph.
 Local legends, primarily those of the Hmar, that describe the presence of remnants of the lost Jewish tribe of Manasseh (Hebrew: Menashe) more than 1,000 years ago in a cave in southwestern China called Sinlung, whose members migrated across Thailand into northeastern India.

Believing that these people were descendants of Israelites, Avichail named the group Bnei Menashe. He began to teach them normative Orthodox Judaism. He prepared to pay for their aliyah with funds provided by Christian groups supporting the Second Coming. But the Israeli government did not recognize the Messianic groups in India as candidates for aliyah.

Several years later, the rabbi stepped aside as a leader of Amishav in favour of Michael Freund. The younger man was a columnist for The Jerusalem Post and former deputy director of communications and policy planning in the Prime Minister's office. The two men quarreled.

Freund founded another organization, Shavei Israel, also devoted to supporting aliyah by descendants of lost tribes. Each of the two men have attracted the support of some Bnei Menashe in Israel. "Kuki-Mizo tribal rivalries and clans have also played a role in the split, with some groups supporting one man and some the other." Freund uses some of his private fortune to support Shavei Israel. It has helped provide Jewish education for the Bnei Menashe in Aizawl and Imphal, the capitals of two northeast Indian states.

In mid-2005, with the help of Shavei Israel and the local council of Kiryat Arba, the Bnei Menashe opened its first community centre in Israel. They have built several synagogues in northeast India. In July 2005, they completed a mikveh (ritual bath) in Mizoram under the supervision of Israeli rabbis. This is used in Orthodox Jewish practice and its use is required as part of the formal Orthodox process of conversion of candidates to Judaism. Shortly after, Bnei Menashe built a mikveh in Manipur.

DNA testing results 
Observers thought that DNA testing might indicate whether there was Middle Eastern ancestry among the Bnei Menashe. Some resisted such testing, acknowledging that their ancestors had intermarried with other peoples but saying that did not change their sense of identification as Jews. In 2003 author Hillel Halkin helped arrange genetic testing of Mizo-Kuki peoples. A total of 350 genetic samples were tested at Haifa's Technion – Israel Institute of Technology under the auspices of Prof. Karl Skorecki. According to the late Isaac Hmar Intoate, a scholar involved with the project, researchers found no genetic evidence of Middle-Eastern ancestry for the Mizo-Chin-Kuki men. The study has not been published in a peer-reviewed journal.

In December 2004, Kolkata's Central Forensic Science Laboratory posted a paper at Genome Biology on the Internet. This had not been peer reviewed. They tested a total of 414 people from tribal communities (Hmar, Kuki, Mara, Lai and Lusei) of the state of Mizoram. They found no evidence among the men of Y-DNA haplotypes indicating Middle Eastern origin. Instead, the haplotypes were distinctly East and Southeast Asian in origin. In 2005, additional tests of MtDNA were conducted for 50 women from these communities. The researchers said they found some evidence of Middle Eastern origin, which may have been an indicator of intermarriage during the people's lengthy migration period. While DNA is not used as a determinant of Jewish ancestry, it can be an indicator. It has been found in the Y-DNA among descendants in some other populations distant from the Middle East who claim Jewish descent, some of whose ancestors are believed to have been male Jewish traders.

Israeli Professor Skorecki said of the Kolkata studies that the geneticists "did not do a complete 'genetic sequencing' of all the DNA and therefore it is hard to rely on the conclusions derived from a "partial sequencing, and they themselves admit this." He added

the absence of a genetic match still does not say that the Kuki do not have origins in the Jewish people, as it is possible that after thousands of years it is difficult to identify the traces of the common genetic origin. However, a positive answer can give a significant indication.

BBC News reported, "[T]he Central Forensic Institute in Calcutta suggests that while the masculine side of the tribes bears no links to Israel, the feminine side suggests a genetic profile with Middle Eastern people that may have arisen through inter-marriage". The social scientist Lev Grinberg commented that "right wing Jewish groups wanted such conversions of distant people to boost the population in areas disputed by the Palestinians."

Acceptance 
In April 2005, the Sephardi Chief Rabbi Shlomo Amar, one of Israel's two Chief Rabbis, formally accepted the Bnei Menashe as descendants of one of the lost tribes after years of review of their claims and other research. His decision allows the Bnei Menashe to immigrate as Jews to Israel under the country's Law of Return. But he requires them to undergo formal conversion to Judaism to be fully accepted as Jews, because of their long interruption from the people.

Most ethnic Mizo-Kuki-Chin have rejected the Bnei Menashe claim of Jewish origin; they believe their peoples are indigenous to Asia, as supported by the Y-DNA test results. Academics in Israel and elsewhere also have serious questions about any Jewish ancestry for this group.

By 2006, some 1,700 Bnei Menashe had moved to Israel, where they were settled in the West Bank and Gaza Strip (before the disengagement). They were required to undergo Orthodox conversion to Judaism, including study and immersion in a mikveh. The immigrants were put in the settlements as these offered cheaper housing and living expenses than some other areas. The Bnei Menashe composed the largest immigrant population in the Gaza Strip before Israel withdrew its settlers from the area. Now they  are mainly concentrated in Kiryat Arba, Sderot, Beit El, Ofra, Nitzan, Carmiel, Afula and Maalot.

Learning Hebrew has been a great challenge, especially for the older generation, for whom the phonology of their native Indic and Tibeto-Burman languages makes Hebrew especially challenging. Younger members have had more opportunities to learn Hebrew, as they are more involved in society. Some have gained jobs as soldiers; others as nurses' aides for the elderly and infirm.

Political issues in Israel and India

The mass conversions of Bnei Menashe after their immigration to Israel became controversial. In June 2003, Interior Minister Avraham Poraz of Shinui halted Bnei Menashe immigration to Israel. Shinui leaders had expressed concern that "only Third World residents seem interested in converting and immigrating to Israel." In the previous decade, 800 Mizo had immigrated to Israel and converted to Judaism.

Ofir Pines-Paz, Minister of Science and Technology, said that the Bnei Menashe were "being cynically exploited for political purposes." He objected to the new immigrants being settled in the unstable territory of the Gaza Strip's Gush Katif settlements (which were evacuated two years later) and in the West Bank. Rabbi Eliyahu Birnbaum, a rabbinical judge dealing with the conversion of Bnei Menashe, accused the Knesset Absorption Committee of making a decision based on racist ideas. At the time, Michael Freund, with the Amishav organization, noted that assimilation was proceeding; young men of the Bnei Menashe served in Israeli combat units.

The rapid rise in conversions also provoked political controversy in Mizoram, India. The Indian government believed that the conversions encouraged identification with another country, in an area already characterized by separatist unrest. P.C. Biaksiama of the Aizawl Christian Research Centre said,

[T]he mass conversion by foreign priests will pose a threat not only to social stability in the region, but also to national security. A large number of people will forsake loyalty to the Union of India, as they all will become eligible for a foreign citizenship.

He wrote the book, Mizo Nge Israel? ("Mizo or Israeli?") (2004), exploring this issue. He does not think the people have a legitimate claim to Jewish descent. Leaders of the Presbyterian Church in Mizoram, the largest denomination, have objected to the Israelis' activity there.

In March 2004, Biaksiama appeared on television, discussing the issues with Lalchhanhima Sailo, founder of Chhinlung Israel People's Convention (CIPC), a secessionist Mizo organization. Sailo said that CIPC's goal was not emigration to Israel, but to have the United Nations declare the areas inhabited by Mizo tribes to be an independent nation for Mizo Israelites. The region has had numerous separatist movements and India has struggled to maintain peace there.

After Rabbi Amar's ruled in 2005 that the Bnei Menashe would be accepted as a lost tribe and Jews after completing conversion, the plan was for Bnei Menashe to undergo conversion while living in India, at which time they would be qualified for aliyah. In September 2005, a task force from the Chief Rabbinate's Beit Din (rabbinic court) traveled to India to complete the conversion of a group of 218 Bnei Menashe. India expressed strong concern to Israel about the mass conversions, saying its laws prohibit such interference by members of another nation. It wants to avoid proselytizing by outside groups and religious conflicts in its diverse society. In November 2005, the Israeli government withdrew the rabbinic court team from India because of the strained relations.

Some Bnei Menashe supporters said that Israeli officials failed to explain to the Indian government that the rabbis were formalizing the conversions of Bnei Menashe who had already accepted Judaism, rather than trying to recruit new members. Some Hindu groups criticised the Indian government, saying that it took Christian complaints about Jewish proselytizing more seriously than theirs. They have complained for years about Christian missionaries recruiting Hindus without receiving any governmental response.

In July 2006, Israeli Immigration Absorption Minister Zeev Boim said that the 218 Bnei Menashe who had completed their conversions would be allowed to enter the country, but "first the government must decide what its policy will be towards those who have yet to (formally) convert." A few months later, in November 2006, the 218 Bnei Menashe arrived in Israel and were settled in Upper Nazareth and Karmiel. The government has encouraged more people to settle in the Galilee and the Negev. The next year, 230 Bnei Menashe arrived in Israel in September 2007, having completed the formal conversion process in India.

In October 2007, the Israeli government said that approval of travelers' entry into Israel for the purpose of mass conversion and citizenship would have to be decided by the full Cabinet, rather than by the Interior Minister alone. This decision was expected to be a major obstacle in Shavei Israel's endeavours to bring all Bnei Menashe to Israel. The government suspended issuing visas to the Bnei Menashe.

In 2012, after a change in government, the Israel legislature passed a resolution to resume allowing immigration of Bnei Menashe. Fifty-four entered the country in January 2013, making a total of 200 immigrants, according to Shavei Israel.

Legends
All of the folklore which supports the Bnei Menashe's Jewish ancestry are taken/found in Hmar history. One such is the traditional Hmar harvest festival (Sikpui Ruoi) song, "Sikpui Hla (Sikpui Song)," which refers to events and images similar to some in the Book of Exodus, is evidence of their Israelite ancestry. Studies of comparative religion, however, have demonstrated recurring motifs and symbols in unrelated religions and peoples in many regions. In addition, other Mizo-Kuki-Hmar people say that this song is an ancient one of their culture. The song includes references to enemies chasing the people over a red-coloured sea, quails, and a pillar of cloud. Such images and symbols are not exclusive to Judaism.

Translation of the lyrics:

While we are preparing for the Sikpui Feast,
The big red sea becomes divided;
As we march along fighting our foes,
We are being led by pillar of cloud by day,
And pillar of fire by night.
Our enemies, O ye folks, are thick with fury,
Come out with your shields and arrows.
Fighting our enemies all day long,
We march forward as cloud-fire goes before us.
The enemies we fought all day long,
The big sea swallowed them like wild beast.
Collect the quails,
And draw the water that springs out of the rock.

Michael Freund, the director of Shavei Israel, wrote that the Bnei Menashe claim to have a chant they call "Miriam's Prayer." By that time, he had been involved for years in promoting the Bnei Menashe as descended from Jews and working to facilitate their aliyah to Israel. He said that the words of the chant were identical to the ancient Sikpui Song. The Post article is the first known print reference to Miriam's Prayer, aka "Sikpui Hla."

Films
Quest for the Lost Tribes. (2000) Directed by Simcha Jacobovici.
Return of the Lost Tribe. Directed by Phillipe Stroun
This Song Is Old (2009), Directed by Bruce Sheridan

See also 
 Bene Ephraim
 Gathering of Israel
 Groups claiming affiliation with Israelites
 History of the Jews in India
 History of the Jews in Kolkata

References and notes

Further reading
Hillel Halkin, Beyond the Sabbath River (2002)
 Zaithanchhungi, Zaii. Israel-Mizo Identity: Mizos (Chhinlung Tribes) Children of Menashe are the Descendants of Israel. Mizoram: L.N. Thuanga "Hope Lodge", 2008.
 Parfitt, T. (2007) 'Tribal Jews.' In: Katz, N., (ed.), Indo-judaic studies in the twenty-first century a view from the margin. New York: Palgrave Macmillan, pp. 181-196
 Weil, Shalva. "Ten Lost Tribes", in Raphael Patai and Haya Bar Itzhak (eds.) Jewish Folklore and Traditions: A Multicultural Encyclopedia, ABC-CLIO, Inc. 2013, (2: 542–543).

External links 

Bnei Menashe Official Website
 

Jews and Judaism in India
 
Jewish ethnic groups
Groups claiming Israelite descent
Groups who converted to Judaism